Ignacyo Mateusz Matynia (born May 29, 1992) is a Polish-American actor. He is known for his performance in the Lifetime original film My Nightmare Landlord (2020) as the titular character. His notable film credits include the 2021 independent films One and the Same and Break Every Chain.

Early life and career
Matynia was born in Busko Zdroj, Poland on May 29, 1992 and moved with his family to the United States in 1995, settling in Staten Island, NY. After graduating from Xaverian High School in 2010, he began his studies at the SUNY University of Albany with a desire to go to medical school. But it was there that he began his passion for acting, and in 2013, he dropped out of college to pursue this as a career, while working part-time as a DJ.

In 2014, Matynia was discovered by Sedly Bloomfield of the Lee Strasberg Theatre and Film Institute, who became his mentor. His studies led him to star in over 40 short films, some of which earned him numerous awards and nominations at film festivals, including the Idyllwild International Festival of Cinema. That same year, he made his feature film acting debut in The Grievance Group. He then went on to appear in guest roles on television shows including ABC's Forever, Marvel Studios' Luke Cage, Starz' Vida and NBC's Law & Order: Special Victims Unit.

In 2018 and 2019, after moving to Los Angeles, he was cast in the feature films Like Dogs and One and the Same, the latter of which was released by Gravitas Ventures on Blu-ray and on demand on March 23, 2021. 

In 2020, Matynia was cast in The Institute and Break Every Chain, two of the first films that were able to proceed with production, with COVID-19 safety measures in place. The latter film, in which he plays police officer Jonathan Hickory, who wrote the autobiographical novel the film is based on, held its world premiere on February 20, 2021 in Tempe, Arizona.

Filmography

Film

Television

Awards and nominations

References

External links
 Ignacyo's Website
 

1992 births
Living people
Polish male film actors
American male film actors
American male television actors
21st-century American male actors
University at Albany, SUNY alumni
Xaverian High School alumni
People from Busko County
Polish emigrants to the United States